The 2019 Women's March was a protest that occurred on January 19, 2019 in America. It follows the 2017 Women's March and 2018 Women's March.

In 2017, a "Women's March" was held on January 21, 2017, following U.S. president Donald Trump's inauguration which attracted attention due to the controversial campaign, also supporting a variety of human rights. Example of rights included gender equality, civil rights, and future issues to arise.

In February 2018, the March became the focus of controversy following reports that three of the four lead organizers had attended events hosted by Nation of Islam leader Louis Farrakhan, who has made remarks widely regarded as anti-Semitic. Perceptions that the group's leaders had failed to condemn the rhetoric and subsequent accusations of anti-Semitism within the organization itself led to former co-founder Teresa Shook to call for their resignations. These accusations were followed by the disassociation of numerous state chapters. By December 2018, The New York Times reported that "charges of anti-Semitism are now roiling the movement and overshadowing plans for more marches."

News reports from across North America noted that turnout for the 2019 Women's March was lower compared to previous years, with potential reasons being poor weather, a decline in interest and controversy over protest organization in the United States with the controversies involving the March's leadership. Although the third Women's March was significantly smaller than the previous years, thousands of people all across the U.S. still decided to partake in the march.

Controversy surrounding national organizers

Linda Sarsour, Tamika Mallory, Bob Bland, and Carmen Perez are the co-chairs of Women's March, Inc., which represents and coordinates various Women's March events nationally. In 2018 Sarsour announced that the principal march sponsored by the national organization would take place in Washington, D.C.

In November 2018, media outlets reported on calls for the four co-chairs to resign for failing to denounce Nation of Islam leader Louis Farrakhan. The Daily Beast traced the controversy to February 2018, when Mallory attended a Nation of Islam Saviours' Day event hosted by Farrakhan, during which he referred to the "Satanic Jew" and declared that "the powerful Jews are my enemy." The Daily Beast later reported that the Women's March appeared to be losing support, as the number of sponsors dropped from 550 in 2017 to just 200 in 2019. The attendance at the 2019 March also experienced a steep decline.

In October 2018, actress Alyssa Milano, who spoke at the 2018 Women's March, told The Advocate that she has refused to participate in the 2019 March unless Mallory and Sarsour condemned what have been described as homophobic, anti-Semitic, and transphobic comments by Farrakhan. The Women's March released a statement about anti-Semitism, defending Sarsour and Mallory.

In November 2018, Teresa Shook, the co-founder of the Women's March, called for march organizers Bland, Mallory, Sarsour and Perez to resign, saying, "they have allowed anti-Semitism, anti-LBGTQIA sentiment and hateful, racist rhetoric to become a part of the platform by their refusal to separate themselves from groups that espouse these racist, hateful beliefs." The organization's leadership rebuffed calls to step down; Sarsour's initial response alleged that criticisms were motivated by racism and her opposition to Israel. Sarsour later issued a statement that apologized to the March's supporters for its "slow response" and condemned anti-Semitism.

In December 2018, Tablet published an article by Leah McSweeney and Jacob Siegel alleging that during the first meeting between Bland, Mallory, Perez, and others in the days after the 2016 US Presidential election, Mallory and Perez repeated an anti-Semitic canard promoted in Farrakhan's book The Secret Relationship Between Blacks and Jews  telling fellow organizer Vanessa Wruble, who is Jewish, that Jews were leaders in the American slave trade and are especially responsible for subsequent exploitation of racial minorities. Wruble suggested that Mallory and Perez had berated her for her Jewish heritage, saying "your people hold all the wealth." Mallory denied Wruble's account but acknowledged telling "white women" at the meeting, including Wruble, that she "did not trust them."

Speakers and participating officials
Noted speakers at various events included New York senator Kirsten Gillibrand, congresswoman Alexandria Ocasio-Cortez, congresswoman Ayanna Pressley and congresswoman Barbara Lee. House Speaker Nancy Pelosi also joined marchers in San Francisco as well as mayor Eric Garcetti on the march in Los Angeles. Representative Katie Hill also took the stage in the Los Angeles March. Celebrities that also spoke were actress, chair, and Artist Table of Women's March on Washington, America Ferrera as well as actress and activist, Scarlett Johansson.

Sponsorships 

Sponsors included Scotch whiskey company Johnnie Walker, ice cream Ben and Jerry's, and German marketing firm Echte Liebe.

In January 2019, organizations including the Democratic National Committee, the Southern Poverty Law Center and EMILY's List withdrew from the list of Women's March sponsors, shrinking the list of over 500 partner organizations by almost half. Other sponsors who withdrew their support include the NAACP, Emily's List, NARAL, the National Abortion Federation, the AFL-CIO, the SEIU and its health-care union 1199SEIU, GLAAD, the Human Rights Campaign, Center for American Progress, and National Resources Defense Council.

On January 13, 2019, Haaretz reported that only two Jewish groups sponsored the March, "after a long list backed the march in previous years."

The New Wave Feminists, a group against abortion, joined in this year's March, despite being removed as a partner before the 2017 March.

The Women's Agenda 
A month prior to the 2019 Women's March, the Women's March organization posted an agenda of its goals for the 2019 March. The organization named it the Women's Agenda. This is the first federal policy platform the organization has created. On the same day the Agenda was posted, the organizers also announced the date of the 2019 March. Website viewers have the ability to digitally endorse the agenda. The organization involved 70 movement leaders to develop this agenda that includes 24 federal policies believed to be essential. Some of these policies include: ending violence against women and femmes, ending state violence, immigrant rights, disability rights, racial justice, environmental justice and LGBTQIA's rights. For more in-depth information, the organization has provided a 71-page document that deeply examines each of the 24 goals. Each of the goal's sections highlights the theory of change that will be used in order to achieve it. Many of the 24 essential goals have more than one policy goal.

Regional marches

Alabama
Birmingham Women's March was dedicated to people of color. The march focused on black women's wellness to connect them with resources for their mental and physical health.

California
Leaders of the Los Angeles March disavowed any relationship with the national organization. The Humboldt County March, held in Eureka, California, was canceled due to the organizers' concern that the March would reflect the population of the county by being, "overwhelmingly white," thereby failing to represent "several perspectives in our community." Humboldt County is about 74 percent non-Hispanic white; thus, commentators argued over the necessity to cancel a march whose participating audience's demographic was reflective of the population. The Eureka march was rescheduled by a different group of organizers including former Eureka city councilwoman Linda Atkins. While some local groups boycotted the march, it was held in Eureka on Saturday, January 19, 2019, according to an article in the Times Standard on January 16, 2019. In response to the cancellation of the Women's March in Eureka, the Eureka group said it was considering holding an event in March to celebrate International Women's Day, which is on March 8.

In the Bay Area, marches took place in San Francisco, Oakland, San Jose, Santa Rosa, Alameda, Tri-Valley, Walnut Creek, Napa, Vallejo and Petaluma. San Francisco's Women's March turnout was "among the largest in the nation," according to local Bay Area news station KRON4. March organizers in Santa Rosa asserted independence and disaffiliation from the national Women's March in Washington, citing concerns of antisemitism at the national level. Women's March Contra Costa (Walnut Creek) also denied affiliation with the national movement. Women's March in Vallejo, California was among the first to raise concerns in July 2018, and also distanced itself.

In Southern California, marches had an aura of celebration to them as participants had claimed recent victories in the 2018 midterm election where Republican strongholds such as Orange County had turned blue and elected more women than ever before to Congress.

The Los Angeles march was organized by Women's March LA, an organization unaffiliated with the national organization Women's March, Inc.  Emiliana Guereca, cofounder of the local Los Angeles march, distanced her march from the rhetoric of Louis Farrakhan and the behavior of the organizers of the national Women's March. Guereca had personally promised Nicole Guzik, a prominent Los Angeles rabbi, that "Israel would not be attacked, labeling Israel as an apartheid state would be unwelcome on the stage and if a speaker went off script, the managers of the program would raise the music." After Rabbi Guzik had encouraged Los Angeles area Jewish women to join her on the march, Guzik reported, "In the very first hour of the Women's March L.A. program at Pershing Square, all [Guereca's] promises were broken.  ...  It's with the heaviest of hearts, that I admit I was wrong. This March was clearly not meant for me."

District of Columbia
Competing events in Washington, D.C. included the March For All Women organized by the politically conservative Independent Women's Forum, as well as the Inclusive Women 4 Equality for All Rally, which drew significantly smaller numbers.

A man attending the rally alleges he was sexually assaulted by a woman in an incident partially caught on camera. The woman was later charged with misdemeanor sex abuse.

Illinois
The organizers of the Women's March Chicago announced they had canceled plans for a march in January 2019, citing high costs. They denied that the decision was in response to the controversy over antisemitism in the national movement but called the opportunity to distance itself from the national leadership a "side benefit."  Instead they planned a "day of service".   A small march of "several hundred" was organized independently.

Louisiana
The New Orleans March was canceled in early January 2019 over the allegations of antisemitism against the national leadership. In a statement, the chapter said, "The controversy is dampening efforts of sister marches to fundraise, enlist involvement, find sponsors and attendee numbers have drastically declined this year. New Orleans is no exception."

Michigan
In December 2018, some leaders of the Michigan March disaffiliated themselves from the national organization and urged fellow activists to do the same. The 2019 March in Michigan was different from previous years' Marches, which had taken place at the Michigan Capitol building. The organizers chose to move the March to Detroit, hoping to make the March more accessible via metro, "especially [to] communities of color and people who may not have any means of driving to Lansing."

Nebraska
The Women's March on Lincoln 2019 was rescheduled to Sunday, January 27 in downtown Lincoln, due to weather.

New York City 
In November, organizers of the annual New York City March, the Women's March Alliance, which organized the New York Marches in 2017 and 2018, and held a permit for a January 19, 2019, march, objected to the efforts of the national group led by Sarsour, Women's March, Inc., to take control of the 2019 New York City March. March Alliance organizer Katherine Siemionko said that her group had lost "thousands" of followers on social media and donors and that well known people had turned down invitations to speak at the march. The Alliance, the sole group with a permit to march, started at 72nd Street and Central Park West and marched to 44th St.

By December, the New York March had split into two marches, one affiliated with the national group, and the other led by March On, a group created by multiple sister march organizers and led by Vanessa Wruble, co-founder and Head of Campaign Operations of the 2017 Women's March, who left the group and charges that the national organizers made antisemitic assertions during the organizing effort for the founding event. The newer New York City Women's March, affiliated with Sarsour and Mallory's Washington D.C.-based organization, had a permit for a "rally" in the park at Foley Square.

Philadelphia 
Women in Philadelphia organized two separate marches, one was Philadelphia's Women's March chapter that is affiliated with the Washington, D.C. based organization, and the other independent of it. The independent march was organized by Philly Women Rally. The Women's March affiliated with the Women's March organization took place at LOVE Park and the other march started at Logan Square.

Washington
The Washington state Women's March voted to discontinue the Tacoma march due to disagreement of the support given by the national leadership to Farrakhan. The Spokane, Washington march attracted 8,000 in 2017 and 6,000 in 2018. Angie Beem, leader of the Washington state March and a President of the Board of Women's March Washington, criticized the March's national leaders and said of the organization "continuing to be a part of the Women's March with the blatant bigotry they display would be breaking a promise. We can't betray our Jewish community by remaining a part of this organization."

See also
 List of protest marches on Washington, D.C.

References

External links 

 Womens March

2019 in American politics
2019 in women's history
2019 protests
Fourth-wave feminism
History of women's rights
January 2019 events in the United States
Women's marches
2019
2019 Women's March
African American–Jewish relations
Left-wing antisemitism
Antisemitic attacks and incidents in the United States